Deanne Soza (born September 24, 2001 in Orem, Utah) is a former American artistic gymnast.

Competitive History

2013 
Soza competed at the 2013 Secret U.S. Classic, placing 16th all-around. She advanced to Nationals where she accumulated a two-day score of 103.050, placing 26th.

2014 
Deanne kicked off the 2014 season finishing 3rd at the American Classic, held at the Karolyi's Ranch.

Soza later competed at the Secret U.S. Classic where she placed 3rd with Norah Flatley. She also took home a silver on uneven bars and a bronze on vault.

She was expected to compete at the 2014 P&G Championships in Pittsburgh, Pennsylvania.

In September 2014, Deanne contracted a rare eye infection which could have blinded her. She healed fully and resumed training.

2015
Soza returned to competition at the 2015 U.S. Classic on July 25. She placed 5th in the junior all-around competition with a score of 55.550, including 2nd on balance beam with a score of 14.5 and tied for 3rd on floor exercise (with Laurie Hernandez) with a score of 14.350. These scores were sufficient for her to once again qualify to the P&G National Championships.

2016
In January 2016, FloGymnastics released an article that revealed that Soza could have died as a result of her eye infection.

References 

2001 births
American female artistic gymnasts
Junior artistic gymnasts
Living people
Sportspeople from Orem, Utah
U.S. women's national team gymnasts
21st-century American women